Francisco Andrés Escobar (October 10, 1942; San Salvador – May 9, 2010) was a Salvadorian actor, writer and journalist. He studied Bachelor of Arts in Social Work and Political Science at the Universidad Centroamericana "Jose Simeon Cañas".
He has also directed a dramatic piece of his own composition, A Certain Ignacio (1994), which was dedicated to the memory of Ignacio Ellacuría, the rector at UCA.

References

1942 births
2010 deaths
People from San Salvador
Salvadoran actors
Salvadoran male writers
Salvadoran journalists
Male journalists
Central American University alumni